Boisselier is a surname, and may refer to:

 Antoine-Félix Boisselier (1790–1857), French painter
 Brigitte Boisselier (born 1956), head of Clonaid, the "scientific wing" of the Raëlians
 Jean Boisselier (1912–1996), French archaeologist and art historian specialised in Khmer art
 Julien Boisselier (born 1970), French actor